The Moscow Articles of 1665 was an agreement signed on 11 October 1665 between the Cossack Hetmanate Hetman Ivan Briukhovetsky and the Tsardom of Russia.

The treaty put Left-Bank Ukraine under the control of the Russian Tsar.  The terms of the agreements were:
Russian military governors were to take control of all military, administrative, and fiscal power
Increased number of troops in Ukraine, and the obligation to feed and maintain them
Garrisons in all major towns: Chernihiv, Pereiaslav, Nizhyn, Poltava, Kremenchuk, Novhorod-Siverskyi, Oster, Kyiv, Kaniv, and Kodak
Taxes collected and put in the Tsar's treasury
The Ukrainian Orthodox Church was made subordinate to the Patriarch of Moscow
This agreement was largely viewed in Ukraine unfavorably as treason and caused massive uproar. It was one of the reasons for Hetman Briukhovetsky's murder by a Cossack mob.

References 
 Oleksander Ohloblyn. Encyclopedia of Ukraine Vol. 3 (1993)

1665 in law
1665 in Russia
Treaties of the Cossack Hetmanate
Treaties of the Tsardom of Russia
Russia–Ukraine relations
17th century in the Zaporozhian Host
Bilateral treaties of Russia